The North Star was a nineteenth-century anti-slavery newspaper published from the Talman Building in Rochester, New York, by abolitionist Frederick Douglass. The paper commenced publication on December 3, 1847, and ceased as The North Star in June 1851, when it merged with Gerrit Smith's Liberty Party Paper (based in Syracuse, New York) to form Frederick Douglass' Paper. At the time of the Civil War, it was Douglass' Monthly.

The North Stars slogan was: "Right is of no Sex—Truth is of no Color—God is the Father of us all, and all we are Brethren."

Inspiration 

In 1846, Frederick Douglass was first inspired to publish The North Star after subscribing to The Liberator, a weekly newspaper published by William Lloyd Garrison. The Liberator was a newspaper established by Garrison and his supporters founded upon moral principles. The North Star title was a reference to the directions given to runaway slaves trying to reach the Northern states and Canada: "Follow the North Star." Figuratively, Canada was also "the north star."

Like The Liberator, The North Star published weekly and was four pages long. It sold by subscription of $2 per year to more than 4,000 readers in the United States, Europe, and the Caribbean. The first of its four pages focused on current events concerning abolitionist issues.

The Garrisonian Liberator was founded upon the notion that the Constitution was fundamentally pro-slavery and that the Union ought to be dissolved. Douglass disagreed but supported the nonviolent approach to the emancipation of slaves by education and moral suasion. Under the guidance of the abolitionist society, Douglass became well acquainted with the pursuit of the emancipation of slaves through a New England religious perspective. Garrison had earlier convinced the Massachusetts Anti-Slavery Society to hire Douglass as an agent, touring with Garrison and telling audiences about his experiences as a slave. Douglass worked with another abolitionist, Martin R. Delany, who traveled to lecture, report, and generate subscriptions to The North Star.

Editorial perspective and breadth

Douglass's thoughts toward political inaction changed when he attended the National Convention of Colored Citizens, an antislavery convention in Buffalo, New York, in August 1843. One of the many speakers present at the convention was Henry Highland Garnet. Formerly a slave in Maryland, Garnet was a Presbyterian minister who supported violent action against slaveholders. Garnet's demands of independent action addressed to the American slaves remained one of the leading issues of change for Douglass.

During a nineteen-month stay in Britain and Ireland, several of Douglass' supporters bought his freedom and assisted with the purchase of a printing press. With this assistance, Douglass was determined to begin an African-American newspaper that would engage the anti-slavery movement politically. On his return to the United States in March 1847, Douglass shared his ideas of The North Star with his mentors. Ignoring the advice of the American Anti-Slavery Society, Douglass moved to Rochester, New York to publish the first edition. When questioned on his decision to create The North Star, Douglass is said to have responded,

I still see before me a life of toil and trials..., but, justice must be done, the truth must be told...I will not be silent.

In covering politics in Europe, literature, slavery in the United States, and culture generally in both The North Star and Frederick Douglass' Paper, Douglass achieved unconstrained independence to write freely on topics from the California Gold Rush to Uncle Tom's Cabin to Charles Dickens's Bleak House. In 1848, he published an open letter to Horatio Gates Warner after Warner objected to Rosetta Douglass' enrollment at Seward Seminary in Rochester. The letter, which advocated for desegregation of all schools, was republished in papers across the country.

Besides Garnet, other Oneida Institute alumni that collaborated with The North Star were Samuel Ringgold Ward and Jermain Wesley Loguen.

Douglass was assisted by philanthropist Gerrit Smith. Smith later merged his own anti-slavery paper with The North Star to create Frederick Douglass' Paper.

See also

Abolitionist publications
List of newspapers in New York
Shaun King § The North Star

References

Bibliography 
Ira Berlin, "Who Freed the Slaves; Emancipation and Its Meaning", in Blight and Simpson (eds), Union and Emancipation; Essays on Politics and Race in the Civil War Era (Kent State University Press, 1234), p. 121.

External links
 Digitized. Missing issues.
 The North Star newspaper archive, The North Star: Complete December 3, 1847 – April 17, 1851, Accessible Archives (institutional subscription required).
 The North Star, The North Star: Online Collection, Lavery Library, St. John Fisher College (selected issues only).
 "Our Paper and Its Prospects", The North Star, December 3, 1847.
 Douglass' Monthly is available at the Internet Archive.

1847 establishments in New York (state)
Abolitionist newspapers published in the United States
Defunct African-American newspapers
Frederick Douglass
History of Rochester, New York
Newspapers published in Rochester, New York
Publications disestablished in 1851
Newspapers established in 1847
Recipients of aid from Gerrit Smith
Defunct newspapers published in New York (state)
African-American newspapers published in New York (state)